Monument of the Great October Revolution was a Soviet monument that was located on the October Revolution Square from 1977–1991 (now Independence Square) in Kiev, at the time the capital of the Ukrainian SSR as part of the Soviet Union).

Description
The monument had a form of a granite pylon with a figure of Vladimir Lenin out of red granite. In front of the pylon there were four bronze figures of male and female workers, peasant and sailor, each  in height. The whole composition was located on a granite stylobate.

Designers
 Vasyl Borodai, sculptor
 Ivan Znoba, sculptor
 Valentyn Znoba, sculptor
 Oleksandr Malynovsky, architect
 M.Skybytsky, architect

Gallery

See also
 Vladimir Lenin monument, Kyiv
 Decommunization in Ukraine

Notes

References

External links
 Chronology of the Soviet Union disintegration.
 In Kiev took down the Monument commemorating the Great October Socialist Revolution (1991). Calendarium
 Face of Kiev: How in the city monuments were changed. Comments.

History of Kyiv
Maidan Nezalezhnosti
Monuments and memorials in Kyiv
Demolished buildings and structures in Kyiv
Cultural depictions of Vladimir Lenin
Monuments and memorials to Vladimir Lenin
Sculptures in the Soviet Union
Granite sculptures
Sculptures of men
Sculptures of women
Bronze sculptures
Colossal statues in Ukraine
Statues removed in 1991